The Tunu gas field is a natural gas field located in the South China Sea. It was discovered in 1977 and developed by and Pertamina. It began production in 1978 and produces natural gas and condensates. The total proven reserves of the Tunu gas field are around 16.5 trillion cubic feet (399×109m³), and production is slated to be around 350 million cubic feet/day (9.8×105m³).

References

Natural gas fields in Indonesia